Sunshine Acres may refer to:

 Sunshine Acres, Florida
 Sunshine Acres, Queensland, a locality in the Fraser Coast Region, Queensland, Australia